Argiocnemis is a genus of damselfly in the family Coenagrionidae.
Species of Argiocnemis are generally small to medium-sized damselflies, darkly coloured with pale markings.
They occur in Africa, Indian Ocean islands, South-east Asia, New Guinea and Australia.

Species 
The genus Argiocnemis contains the following species:

Argiocnemis ensifera 
Argiocnemis rubescens  - red-tipped shadefly
Argiocnemis solitaria

References

Coenagrionidae
Zygoptera genera
Odonata of Oceania
Odonata of Asia
Odonata of Africa
Odonata of Australia
Taxa named by Edmond de Sélys Longchamps
Damselflies
Taxonomy articles created by Polbot